Salipaludibacillus aurantiacus is a Gram-positive, rod-shaped, endospore-forming and non-motile bacterium from the genus of Salipaludibacillus which has been isolated from the Narayan Sarovar lake in India.

References

External links
Type strain of Salipaludibacillus aurantiacus at BacDive -  the Bacterial Diversity Metadatabase

 

Bacillaceae
Bacteria described in 2016